Caballero Rivero Woodlawn North Park Cemetery and Mausoleum is one of the oldest cemeteries in Miami, Florida. Woodlawn Park Cemetery–North was established in 1913 by three pioneers in Miami’s early history – Thomas O. Wilson, William N. Urmey and Clifton D. Benson. The Woodlawn group of cemeteries grew throughout the years, and funeral homes were added as well. The founders imported rare tropical trees and shrubs to adorn the cemetery, including the first schefflera (umbrella trees) and mahogany trees brought to the United States.

History
Woodlawn Park in 1926 commissioned a noted mausoleum architect, McDonald Lovell, to design a mausoleum for the park. The present building covers more than a city block, accented with marble, stained glass, and hand-wrought bronze gates.

The cemetery contains 13 British Commonwealth war graves of World War II, comprising one British and two New Zealand airmen, and ten Royal Navy personnel.

In 1990, Caballero Funeral Homes (established in 1857 in Havana, Cuba) joined Woodlawn Park Cemeteries and Funeral Home.  In 1993, Rivero Funeral Homes (established in 1946 in Havana, Cuba), the largest funeral home business in Florida, was also acquired and the name changed at that time to Caballero Rivero Woodlawn North Park Cemetery and Mausoleum.

Caballero Rivero Woodlawn North Park Cemetery and Mausoleum is located at 3260 SW 8th St, Miami FL  33135, on SW 8 Street, between 32 and 33 Avenue.

Notable burials

 Desiderio Alberto Arnaz II – youngest mayor of Santiago de Cuba, former Representative of Cuba and father of Desi Arnaz
 Manuel Artime – led the Bay of Pigs invasion
 William Brickell and his wife, Mary – one of the founders of Miami
 Fernando Bujones – Ballet dancer
 Pat Cannon – former U.S. Representative
 Max Carey – Baseball Hall of Famer
 Rafael Guas Inclan – former Vice President of Cuba.
 Matthew Gribble – Olympic swimmer.
 William C. Lantaff – former U.S. Representative
 Gerardo Machado y Morales – former President of Cuba
 Jorge Mas Canosa – Cuban-American activist
 George Merrick – Founder of Coral Gables and the University of Miami
 Kirk Munroe – American writer
 Mary Barr Munroe – clubwoman, conservationist
 Antonio Prío Socarrás – former minister of Cuba
 Sandy Amoros – Professional Baseball player
 Carlos Prío Socarrás – former President of Cuba
 María Dolores "Mary" Tarrero-Serrano – former First Lady of Cuba, wife of Carlos Prío Socarrás
 Francisco Prío Socarrás – former Senator of Cuba
 Maria Regla Prío Socarrás – former Representative of Cuba
 Antonio Prohias – cartoonist who created the comic strip Spy vs. Spy for MAD Magazine
 Manolo Reyes – pioneering Spanish-language news broadcaster
 Ramon Santamaria – Grammy Hall of Famer
 Dixie Dunbar – Singer and Actress
 Hope Portocarrero – former First Lady of Nicaragua
 Anastasio Somoza García – former President of Nicaragua
 Luis Somoza Debayle – former President of Nicaragua
 Alfonso, Prince of Asturias (1907–1938), Count of Covadonga, entombed there from (1938–1985)

References

External links
 
 

Cemeteries in Florida
Geography of Miami
Protected areas of Miami-Dade County, Florida
1913 establishments in Florida